Zealandia is a nearly submerged continental mass.

Zealandia may also refer to:

Places
Zealandia Bank, a submarine volcano in the Marianas archipelago
Zealandia, Saskatchewan, Canada

Ships
, a British Royal Navy battleship renamed HMS Zealandia in 1911
SS Zealandia (1875), an American sail-steamer wrecked off Southport, England in 1917
, an Australian cargo and passenger ship that served as a troopship in both World War I and World War II
ST Zealandia, a British tugboat

Other uses
Zealandia (newspaper), a New Zealand Catholic newspaper published weekly from 1934 to 1989
Zealandia (personification), a female personification of New Zealand
Zealandia (plant), a genus of ferns in the family Polypodiaceae
Zealandia (wildlife sanctuary), Wellington, New Zealand
Zealandia (Asheville, North Carolina), a mansion on the National Register of Historic Places in the United States

See also
 Zeelandia (disambiguation)
 Zealand (disambiguation)